Nasal aperture may refer to:
Posterior nasal apertures
Anterior nasal aperture